Michael 'Mickey' Houston is an Irish Gaelic football manager. He is a former manager of St Eunan's and a selector on the county panel during Mickey Moran's tenure. While working with the senior team he quit after a public falling out with Moran over the substitutions of John Gildea, Johnny McCafferty and Raymond Sweeney during a game. Houston has been linked with the senior Donegal job in the past.

References

Year of birth missing (living people)
Living people
Gaelic football managers
Gaelic football selectors
Place of birth missing (living people)
People associated with St Eunan's College